Imagen Televisión is a national broadcast television network in Mexico, owned by Grupo Imagen. It launched on October 17, 2016, at 8 p.m.

History

Imagen on television

In 2006, Imagen's parent, Grupo Empresarial Ángeles, acquired XHRAE-TV channel 28 in Mexico City from its previous owner, beleaguered businessman Raúl Aréchiga Espinoza, for US$126 million. Imagen already owned radio stations in Mexico City and other major cities nationwide. The next year, GEA relaunched the station as "cadenatres", with the ambition of functioning as Mexico's third broadcast network. Despite this and national basic cable carriage, cadenatres only had a handful of local affiliates. On October 26, 2015, cadenatres was shuttered and replaced with news outlet Excélsior TV as Imagen began preparing to launch its national network.

A new national network
In 2014, the Federal Telecommunications Institute began a bidding process to make available packages of new national television networks. Two packages were available, each containing 123 transmitters. Three bidders continued to the final round: Grupo Imagen, under the name Cadena Tres I, S.A. de C.V.; Grupo Radio Centro; and Organización Editorial Mexicana (Centro de Información Nacional de Estudios Tepeyac, S.A. de C.V.), which operates the ABC Radio network. OEM dropped out unexpectedly just days before the death of its CEO, Mario Vázquez Raña, paving the way for Cadena Tres I and GRC to be declared the winning bidders on March 11, 2015. Imagen paid 1.808 billion pesos for the concession. Radio Centro, whose bid was significantly higher, subsequently ran into financial problems and dropped out, paying only the security deposit; thus, Imagen would be the only new national network created as the result of the bidding process.

The concessions held by Imagen bind them to two coverage clauses; they must serve 30 percent of the population in each of the 32 Mexican federative entities by March 2018, and within five years of the concession award, all 123 transmitters must be on air. Imagen's CEO, Olegario Vázquez Aldir, also announced a planned investment of 10 billion pesos to build out the network over 36 to 40 months.

In October 2015, Imagen was approved to relocate all stations planned to be built above channel 36, in order to facilitate the repacking of television spectrum. Several other transmitters changed allocated channels as a result.

The first of the launch transmitters to come to air was the Mexico City station, XHCTMX-TDT, which signed on with color bars on August 19, 2016. In late September, the launch date was announced as Monday, October 17, and Imagen unveiled a new corporate logo designed by Chermayeff & Geismar & Haviv, a New York-based graphic design firm, which will also serve as the network's logo. In addition, the name of the network, Imagen Televisión, was formally announced, along with the initial slogan Juntos Somos Libres; Vázquez Aldir cited the desire to not merely be "the third network" and to have a more forward-looking moniker as reasons to bypass the Cadena Tres name. The launch makes Imagen the first new national commercial network to begin operations in Mexico since the privatization of Imevisión and resultant creation of Televisión Azteca in 1993.

Programming
Vázquez Aldir described Imagen's programming approach as "a family channel, with a focus on women".

General entertainment

Imagen's first two original telenovelas, produced in collaboration with Argos Comunicación and Estudios TeleMéxico, were Vuelve temprano and Perseguidos. The latter was originally known as El Capo (The Drug Lord) but was changed, potentially to prevent a reclassification of the program that would have required it to air after midnight. The network also picked up two Brazilian telenovelas, José do Egito (Joseph from Egypt) and A Regra do Jogo (Rules of The Game), and the Colombian novela Lady, la vendedora de rosas.

News
Imagen Televisión features three weekday newscasts. Ciro Gómez Leyva, who hosts a Radio Fórmula morning show and formerly worked for Televisa and CNI Canal 40, hosts the network's flagship late news. Francisco Zea hosts the network's morning show, while Yuriria Sierra anchors its afternoon newscast at 2pm.

The network also has a three-hour morning magazine program, Sale el Sol, hosted by Luz María Zetina, Mauricio Barcelata, Carlos Arenas and Paulina Mercado. It also has the two-hour entertainment news program, De Primera Mano, hosted by Gustavo Adolfo Infante, Mónica Noguera and Michelle Ruvalcaba, launched on July 24, 2017. On February 24, 2020, the program, ¡Qué Chulada!, began to air and is hosted by Veronica Toussaint, Marta Guzmán and Mariana H, with Luz María Zetina, Mónica Noguera and Paulina Mercado as co-hosts, being one of the main programs of Imagen Televisión.

Sports
Javier Alarcón was brought in to head Imagen's sports division and was among the first major hires for the network.

Imagen held the rights to broadcast two Liga MX soccer clubs, its co-owned Querétaro FC (until 2020) and Jaguares de Chiapas (which would disappear after the 2017 season), though it subleased much of those rights to SKY México as the network was not on air. Both clubs' home matches will generally air on Saturdays at 5pm. The first soccer match to air on Imagen was a Querétaro fixture against Club América on October 22. For the Clausura 2017 tournament, Imagen  carried Club León and C.F. Pachuca fixtures as well.

One regular sports program airs on Imagen, a Sunday night discussion program titled Adrenalina con Javier Alarcón.

In June 2018, Imagen aired a one-hour version of WWE Raw and SmackDown every Saturday afternoon.

In 2023, the network acquired exclusive broadcasting rights for the 2023 World Baseball Classic and Major League Baseball, replacing TUDN on the latter.

Children's
Imagen's children's programming block consists of a mix of classic series (Maya the Honey Bee, Marco and The Swiss Family Robinson: Flone of the Mysterious Island) and newer programs (Pokémon). This also formerly included programming from Nickelodeon, thus making Imagen the second station to currently air Nick shows in Mexico aside from Canal 5.

Local programming

Currently, only Puebla provides local programming on Imagen Televisión. Imagen TV Puebla launched in January 2018, utilizing the resources of AS Media, which had previously produced TV Azteca Puebla local programs.

Transmitters
Imagen Televisión, through Cadena Tres I, S.A. de C.V., is currently authorized to operate 49 main stations and 14 repeaters; in 2018, its transmitters covered 61.72 percent of the population in parts of all Mexican states. 38 transmitters were on air at launch, while 42 currently operate. The transmitters launched on air are primarily in state capitals, densely populated cities, and those that contribute most to the national gross domestic product. The transmitter network has primarily been deployed using preexisting public and commercial infrastructure, notably including towers owned by the Sistema Público de Radiodifusión del Estado Mexicano (SPR), Canal Once, MVS Radio, and several of Imagen's own radio stations. Each callsign represents the primary city listed in the IFT-defined coverage areas, though in several cases, Imagen built the transmitter in another, larger city within the coverage area—sometimes in another state.

On July 4, 2018, the IFT awarded Imagen TV an 18-month extension of its national coverage obligations. Imagen cited crime problems, negotiations with landowners and municipal permitting processes as factors necessitating the extension. A further extension to the five-year deadline to build out the network was granted in February 2020.

Almost all stations have been allotted virtual channel 3, though one on the border region with the United States—XHCTRM-TDT—is assigned virtual channel 13 because of a potential conflict with KIII-TV in Corpus Christi, Texas, on virtual channel 3.

All transmitters carry Excélsior TV, Imagen's cable news channel, as subchannel 3.4. Until 2020, this did not include the Mexico City transmitter, as Excélsior was available over the air on XHTRES-TDT. Additional transmitters were added for Excélsior TV in December 2017.

The Chihuahua transmitters had been authorized in June 2018 to carry Canal 16, a television channel to be operated by the Chihuahua state government, as subchannel 3.3; after a delay, this service never began operations.

|-

|-

|-

|-

|-

|-

|-

|-

|-

|-

|-

|-

|-

|-

|-

|-

|-

|-

|-

|-

|-

|-

|-

|-

|-

|-

|-

|-

|-

|-

|-

|-

|-

|-

|-

|-

|-

|-

|-

|-

|-

|-

|-

|-

|-

|-

|-

|-

|-

|-

|-

|-

|-

|-

|-

|-

|-

|-

|-

|-

|-

|-

|-

Notes

References

External links

Television channels and stations established in 2016
Grupo Imagen
2016 establishments in Mexico
Television networks in Mexico